Cape Naturaliste is a headland in the south western region of Western Australia at the western edge of the Geographe Bay. It is the northernmost point of the Leeuwin-Naturaliste Ridge which was named after the cape. Also the Leeuwin-Naturaliste National Park, Cape Naturaliste Lighthouse and the Cape to Cape hiking track were named after this location.

Settlements
The nearest settlement is Bunker Bay – a community that evolved from holiday shacks to very expensive housing for wealthy residents as well as featuring a popular beach resort.  Further east, across the Bay, is Dunsborough, a much older settlement. Busselton is located still further east from there.

History
The first peoples in Cape Naturaliste were the Wardandi Aboriginals, who called it "Kwirreejeenungup", meaning "the place with the beautiful view". In 1801, the French navigator Nicolas Baudin stopped here on 30 May during his exploration of Australia. The French were mapping the coast of New Holland (Australia). Baudin named the bay they found Geographe Bay, after his flagship, Géographe. Later, the cape was named after the expedition's second ship, Naturaliste.

Citations and references
Citations

References
 Fornasiero, F. Jean, Peter Monteath, & John West-Sooby (2004) Encountering Terra Australis: The Australian Voyages of Nicolas Baudin and Matthew Flinders. (Wakefield Press). 
 Marchant, Leslie R. French Napoleonic Placenames of the South West Coast, Greenwood, WA. R.I.C. Publications, 2004.

External links
 Lighthouse visiting information

Naturaliste
Leeuwin-Naturaliste National Park
Cape Naturaliste, Western Australia
Cape to Cape Track